Laurie Ann Goldman is an American businesswoman and investor. She is best known for her time serving as the Chief Executive Officer of Spanx Inc. from 2002 to 2014. AdAge ranked her in its “50 Top Marketing Executives” list in 2005. In August 2018, Goldman joined the board of New Avon LLC and after six months, she was asked to join as Avon CEO in January 2019.

Early life and education
Goldman was born in Clarksdale, Mississippi, the daughter of Donna Ruth (née Berke) and Julius Lazard Levy Jr. (1933). Goldman is Jewish on both her mother's and father's sides. She was raised with her two brothers, Richard and Andrew in New Orleans, Louisiana in a historic home built in 1890 on St. Charles Avenue.

Her father was a general surgeon, chairman of the board, and professor of anatomy at Tulane Medical School. He currently is a captain in the New Orleans Police Department and a philanthropist of Jewish causes including UJA where he was National Vice Chairman and the Institute for Southern Jewish Life.

Goldman attended the Isidore Newman School in New Orleans, where she was on the cross-country team.

She then attended Newcomb College and the University of Texas, where she was a member of the sorority Alpha Epsilon Phi. She attended the Moody School of Communications and graduated with honors. Her first job was as a special events coordinator for Maison Blanche.

Career

R.H. Macy's

Goldman began her career at R.H. Macy & Co. where she worked in the advertising department to launch new brands, execute media relations campaigns, and plan store events.

The Coca-Cola Company

Goldman served for 10 years at The Coca-Cola Company in leading marketing roles including head of the worldwide licensing division for 54 countries. During this time, she also worked on branding Coca-Cola for three different Olympics including the 1996 Atlanta Olympics.

SPANX, Inc.
Laurie Ann Goldman became the CEO of SPANX in 2002. SPANX was reported by Forbes as a billion-dollar company in 2012. She had previously advised founder Sara Blakely on supply side management until she was named CEO. Under Goldman's leadership, SPANX grew from a startup to a global omni-channel retailer with over 300 products and 4 brands in separate channels of distribution. As CEO, Goldman worked to bring SPANX products to more than 11,500 locations across the globe including standalone SPANX stores, and on the runway at New York Fashion Week. Business Insider named Goldman one of “The Sexiest CEO Alive". She exited the position in 2014.

Avon
In August 2018, Goldman joined the board of New Avon, which, at that time, was owned by Cerberus Capital Management, and took over as their CEO in January 2019. She transitioned into that position after founding her own investing and advisory firm, LA Ventures. It was announced in April 2019, that New Avon was to be acquired by LG.

Corporate Boards and investing

Goldman currently is a board director for Guess? Inc., ServiceMaster Global Holdings Inc. (NYSE: SERV), and Joe & The Juice. Previously, she served on the boards of Francesca's Holdings Corporation (NASDAQ: FRAN), Enviroscent, and Insightpool. Goldman is also an investor in ThirdLove.

Philanthropy and interests
Goldman is on the board of the Carter Center, Anti-Defamation League, and Atlanta Committee For Progress. She is also involved in City Meals, Women Corporate Directors, Committee of 200, and Chief Executives Organization.

She was previously on the boards of the American Jewish Committee, the Jewish Federation, and Pace Academy

Keynote speaker
Goldman is now sought after as a professional speaker by organizations, corporations, and schools including Commonwealth Institute, Fortune Most Powerful Women Summit, Girl Scouts of the USA, Tulane Business Forum. In June 2018, she spoke at The Metropolitan Museum of Art on collecting objects of art and jewelry at the "Women with a Critical Eye" event.

Accolades
Goldman received the National Human Relations and Leadership Award presented by the American Jewish Committee (AJC). She received the Human Relations award along with Madeleine Albright in New York City with David Harris presenting. She has been listed as one of AdAge's Top 50 Marking executives and was a Jewish Women International (JWI) Honoree.

Goldman also ran the Olympic torch through the streets of Atlanta during the 1996 Olympics.

References

Living people
20th-century American businesspeople
20th-century American businesswomen
21st-century American businesspeople
American women chief executives
Moody College of Communication alumni
American chief executives of fashion industry companies
Year of birth missing (living people)
21st-century American businesswomen